Vice Admiral Sanjay Mahindru, AVSM, NM is a serving flag officer in the Indian Navy. Currently, he is the Deputy Chief of the Naval Staff. He assumed charge on 31 Mar 2022. Prior to this, he served as the Flag Officer Commanding Maharashtra Naval Area (FOMA), having been appointed on 17 October 2016. He earlier served as Flag Officer Submarines from 2015 to 2016.

Career
Mahindru joined and graduated from the National Defence Academy. He was commissioned in the Indian Navy on 1 January 1985. He specialised in navigation and qualified as a submariner. He attended the Joint Services Command and Staff College at United Kingdom. He has served in the Directorate of Submarine Operations and Directorate of Nuclear Submarine Acquisition.

He commanded the Shishumar-class submarine , the cadet training ship  and the lead ship of her class of guided-missile destroyers . He also commanded the submarine base INS Satavahana, the Navy’s submarine training establishment where he set up the School for Advanced Underwater Warfare. 

Mahindru attended the Higher Naval Command Course at the College of Naval Warfare, Mumbai. He later served as the Naval Assistant to the Flag Officer Commanding-in-Chief Western Naval Command and to the Flag Officer Commanding-in-Chief Southern Naval Command. As a Commodore, he headed the Arihant Project, India’s first Nuclear Submarine.

Flag rank
Mahindru was promoted to the rank of Rear Admiral in September 2015 and was appointed Flag Officer Submarines (FOSM), the single-point class authority of submarines in India. After a year-long stint as FOSM, he took over as the Flag Officer Commanding Maharashtra Naval Area (FOMA). As FOMA, he initiated a number of initiatives to improve lives of naval veterans. For his tenure as FOMA, he was awarded the Ati Vishisht Seva Medal on 26 January 2018.

Mahindru subsequently served as the Chief Staff Officer at Headquarters Strategic Forces Command.  In 2019, he was promoted to the rank of Vice Admiral and appointed Deputy Commander-in-Chief of the Strategic Forces Command.

On 31 March 2022, he moved to Naval HQ having been appointed Deputy Chief of the Naval Staff succeeding Vice Admiral Ravneet Singh who superannuated.

Awards and decorations
Mahindru was awarded the Nau Sena Medal (Gallantry) in 2002 and the Ati Vishisht Seva Medal in 2018.

References

Living people
Indian Navy admirals
Submariners
Flag Officers Submarines (India)
Year of birth missing (living people)
Deputy Chiefs of Naval Staff (India)
Recipients of the Ati Vishisht Seva Medal
Recipients of the Nau Sena Medal
Graduates of Joint Services Command and Staff College
Naval War College, Goa alumni